Kaliganj is an upazila of Satkhira District in the Division of Khulna, Bangladesh.

Geography 
It has 41,162 households and total area 333.79 km2.

Kaliganj Upazila is bounded by Debhata Upazila and Assasuni Upazila on the north, Assasuni Upazila on the east, Shyamnagar Upazila on the south and Hingalganj community development block in North 24 Parganas district in West Bengal, India on the west.

Demographics 
According to the 2011 Bangladesh census, Kaliganj had a population of 274,889. Males constituted 49.51% of the population and females 50.49%. Muslims formed 84.26% of the population, Hindus 15.65% and Christians 0.09%. Kaliganj had a literacy rate of 51.78% for the population 7 years and above.

According to the 1991 Bangladesh census, Kaliganj had a population of 225,596. Males constituted 50.7% of the population, and females 49.3%. The population aged 18 or over was 115,458. Kaliganj had an average literacy rate of 32.3% (7+ years), compared to the national average of 32.4%.

History of the War of Liberation 
During the Bangladesh Liberation War in 1971 Kaliganj was under Sector 9. During this time a number of memorable encounters between the freedom fighters and the Pak army were held in the upazila most noted of which were at Basantapur, Khanzia, Pirojpur, Nazimganj, Dudli and Ukshar. Kaliganj was liberated on 20 November 1971.

Administration
Kaliganj Upazila is divided into 12 union parishads: Bhara Simla, Bishnupur, Champaphul, Dakshin Sreepur, Dhalbaria, Krishnanagr, Kushlia, Mathureshpur, Mautala, Nalta, Ratanpur, and Tarali. The union parishads are subdivided into 243 mauzas and 254 villages.

Chairman : Mr. Sayeed Mehedi (From Awami League)

Upazila Nirbahi Officer (UNO) : Golam Moinuddin Hasan

Transport
The Kakshiyali River (actually a canal) bisects the upazila roughly east to west, connecting the Galghasia and Kalindi Rivers.

Media 
 Gram Bangla (1987)
 Kakshiali (1992)
 Surya Tarun
 Kaliganj Barta
 Nadi (1993)
 Mukti Surya (1995)
 Arjita Kantha (1998)
 Mukto Alap (2002)
 Raktim Surya (2004)
 ' Al-Ahsan (2005)
 Smriti (2005)
 Bragratat (2005).

Education
 Kaliganj Govt. College
 Rokeya Monsur Degree Mohila College
 Nalta Ahsania Mission Residential College
 D.r.m United Ideal College, Ratanpur
 Kaliganj Government Secondary School
 Nalta Secondary School
 Dr. Mujib Rubi High School
 [D.K.M.L. School & College, Located at Kushulia, Hat Kh]
 Dhuliapur Adarsha Madhomik Biddaloy, Located at near Secendernagor Choumohoni Bazar
 [ Kazi Alauddin Dgree Collage]

Notable residents
 Khan Bahadur Ahsanullah
 AFM Ruhal Haque
 Mustafizur Rahman
 Amin Khan (actor)
 Sabina Yasmin
 Nilufar Yasmin
 Falguni Hamid
 Rani Sarker

See also 
Upazilas of Bangladesh
Districts of Bangladesh
Divisions of Bangladesh
Satkhira District

References 

Upazilas of Satkhira District
Satkhira District
Khulna Division